The system of  developed in Japan in the 8th century saw certain colors of traditional court clothing reserved for certain ranks of court official at the Imperial Court in Kyoto. The hierarchy of colors was developed under the  system.

History
 was used only for the outerwear of the Emperor of Japan. It was banned for use by anyone except the Japanese monarch. To this day, the ceremonial clothes of the Emperor worn during the enthronement ceremony are dyed in this color, extracted from sumac (Toxicodendron succedaneum), a Japanese wax tree.

Seven additional colors were installed in the 10th and 11th centuries:
  is the color of the outerrobes of the Emperor of Japan. As an exception, this color could be worn by the concubines and mistresses of the monarch, who were in the position of palace servants of the 4th rank, as well as secretaries of the treasury of the 6th rank.
  is the color of the outerwear of the ex-Emperor of Japan.
  is the color of the outerwear of the crown prince of Japan.
  is the outerwear color of 1st rank aristocrats.
  is a reserve forbidden color, a substitute for ochre. Produced from the fruits of gardenia (Gardenia jasminoides), permission to wear this color could be granted by imperial rescript.
  is an alternate forbidden color, a substitute for deep purple. Permission to wear this color could be granted by imperial rescript.
  is a reserve forbidden color, a substitute for deep purple. Produced from the fruit of Biancaea sappan, permission to wear this color could be granted by imperial rescript.

During the Meiji period (1867–1911) of the 19th century, the ban was lifted from all colors except sumac, ochre and gardenia.

Bibliography 
 
 

National colours
Textile arts of Japan
Cultural history of Japan